Deliver Us from Evil is a 2009 Danish thriller film directed by Ole Bornedal.

Cast 
 Lasse Rimmer – Johannes
 Lene Nystrøm – Pernille
 Fanny Bornedal – Viola
 Jacob Ottensten – Frederik
  - Ingvar
  – Anna
 Sonja Richter – presenter

References

External links 
 

2009 drama films
2009 films
2009 thriller drama films
Danish thriller drama films
Films directed by Ole Bornedal
2000s Danish-language films